John Fritz (born March 3, 1994) is an American sports radio personality, who is currently the host of the Jack Fritz at Six show on 94.1 WIP and the producer of the 94.1 WIP Afternoon Show. Additionally, he is the host of The High Hopes Podcast. He is also a frequent weekend host on CBS Sports Radio. A graduate of Bloomsburg University, Fritz was a pitcher on their baseball team.

Early life and education
Fritz was born March 15, 1994, and grew up in West Chester, Pennsylvania. He attended West Chester Rustin High School and graduated in 2012. He then attended Bloomsburg University and initially majored in finance, but struggled in the discipline. Fritz considered majoring in history, to become a teacher, but his love of sports talk radio lead him to major in mass communications. He graduated from Bloomsburg in 2016.

Fritz was a standout pitcher in high school. In the class of 2012, he was rated the #45 pitching prospect and had a fastball that topped out at 85 miles per hour. He committed to Bloomsburg to play baseball. In his freshman year, Fritz made five appearances, including one start, and gave up 11 runs over  innings. In his sophomore year, Fritz appeared in three games, pitching three innings and giving up 3 runs. He finished his collegiate career with a career ERA of 10.32 over  innings pitched and an impressive 13 strikeouts. He left the baseball team after his sophomore season to focus on his education.

Career
In 2016, Fritz created The High Hopes Podcast, a podcast about the Philadelphia Phillies. The podcast is named after the song High Hopes that legendary Phillies play-by-play announcer Harry Kalas would sing. Fritz believed that because of the Phillie's struggles at the time there was a lack of talented broadcasters covering the team and that the podcast would gain in popularity when the Phillies regained their success. The High Hopes Podcast has exploded in listeners due to the Phillie's recent success - including their appearance in the 2022 World Series.

Fritz began his tenure at WIP working eight months after graduating from Bloomsburg working as the producer for WIP's overnight shows. While producing overnight shows, he also served as a fill-in producer for the popular WIP Morning Show with the legendary Angelo Cataldi. Six months later, in 2017, he was named the producer of the Evening Show. He was promoted to the producer of the WIP Afternoon Show, with Jon Marks and Ike Reese, in 2018.

At WIP, Fritz has become one of the most popular personalities on the air for his creativity and entertainment. His Harper Lent segment, where he refrained from something "loved" until the Phillies signed free agent Bryce Harper, was one of his most popular segments. A number of Phillies fans also joined the trend. Another popular segment was when Fritz claimed he could still throw a fastball above 82 miles per hour. As part of a bet with evening show host Joe Giglio, Fritz attended the Reading Fightin Phils game and threw out the ceremonial first pitch. Fritz lost the bet as his pitch was only 79 miles per hour and ended up running in the Fightin Phils' Veggie Race.

In March 2023, it was announced that Fritz would be getting his own show: Jack Fritz at Six. The show runs from 6:00 to 7:00 PM and leads into the WIP's coverage of Phillies games. Additionally, WIP announced that Fritz will host pregame and postgame coverage of Phillies games during the weekday.

Fritz often appears as a host on CBS Sports Radio as a host of their weekend shows. He is also an occasional producer for the Phillies Radio Network.

Personal life
Fritz met his wife Jill Tatios in first grade. He engaged to her in November 2017 and they got married in August 2018. They live in Ardmore, Pennsylvania. 

His father owns Four Fingers Brewing Company in Aston, Pennsylvania.

References

External links
Official WIP Web Site

1994 births
Living people
Bloomsburg University of Pennsylvania alumni
American sports radio personalities
Radio personalities from Philadelphia
People from West Chester, Pennsylvania